Latrice Monique Walker is the Assembly member for the 55th District of the New York State Assembly. She is a Democrat. The district includes portions of Brownsville in Brooklyn.

Life and career
Walker was born and raised in Brownsville, Brooklyn in Prospect Plaza Houses, a NYCHA development. She attended New York City Public Schools, including Brooklyn Technical High School, prior to receiving her bachelor's degree at SUNY Purchase College, and her J.D. from Pace University.

Prior to her election to the Assembly, Walker served as chief counsel to United States Congresswoman Yvette Clarke, who represents much of the same area in Congress. Currently, she resides in Ocean Hill-Brownsville with her daughter, Nile.

Walker is an active member of Zeta Phi Beta sorority.

New York Assembly
In 2014, Assemblyman William F. Boyland Jr. was found guilty of corruption and was therefore forced to resign. As a result, the seat became open and Walker as well as six others entered the race. In a seven-way primary, Walker secured the nomination with just under 40% of the vote. She would easily win the general election.

Walker was sworn into office on January 1, 2015.

References

External links
New York State Assemblywoman Latrice Walker official site

Living people
Democratic Party members of the New York State Assembly
People from Brownsville, Brooklyn
Politicians from Brooklyn
21st-century American politicians
21st-century American women politicians
State University of New York at Purchase alumni
Pace University School of Law alumni
Women state legislators in New York (state)
1979 births